Diversibipalium is a genus of land planarians of the subfamily Bipaliinae (hammerhead flatworms). It was erected to include species lacking sufficient morphological information to allow them to be classified in the appropriate genus.

Taxonomy 
During the second half of the 19th century and the first half of the 20th century, many land planarian species were described based solely on external characters. Currently, the genera of land planarians are highly based on their internal anatomy, especially the anatomy of the copulatory apparatus. As a result, species with old descriptions that were never redescribed, so that their internal anatomy remains unknown, cannot be assigned to the correct genus. Thus, the genus Diversibipalium was created to temporarily accommodate species of the subfamily Bipaliinae whose anatomy of the copulatory apparatus is still unknown.

Species 

Diversibipalium multilineatum  is a large-size invasive species, originally from Japan, now found in several European countries. It is superficially similar to Bipalium kewense, which is even more widespread in the world, but can be easily distinguished by the marking on its head (D. multilineatum has an 'exclamation point' on the head).

Diversibipalium mayottensis Justine, Gastineau, Gros, Gey, Ruzzier, Charles & Winsor, 2022 is a small-size species, found only in the French island of Mayotte, in the Indian Ocean. According to a comparative study of the mitochondrial genomes and other genes, D. mayottensis is the sister-group to all other bipaliines.

The genus Diversibipalium currently contains the following species:

Diversibipalium andrewsi 
Diversibipalium bleekeri 
Diversibipalium boehmigi 
Diversibipalium brauni 
Diversibipalium brunneum 
Diversibipalium cantori 
Diversibipalium catenatum 
Diversibipalium claparedei 
Diversibipalium claviforme 
Diversibipalium delicatum 
Diversibipalium dendrophilum 
Diversibipalium dihangense 
Diversibipalium engeli 
Diversibipalium expeditionis 
Diversibipalium falcatum 
Diversibipalium ferudpoorense 
Diversibipalium flowei 
Diversibipalium fuligineum 
Diversibipalium fuscocephalum 
Diversibipalium gebai 
Diversibipalium giganteum 
Diversibipalium grandidieri 
Diversibipalium haasei 
Diversibipalium hasseltii 
Diversibipalium indicum 
Diversibipalium isabellinum 
Diversibipalium jalorense 
Diversibipalium jansei 
Diversibipalium keshavi 
Diversibipalium kirckpatricki 
Diversibipalium koreense 
Diversibipalium kuhlii 
Diversibipalium longitudinalis 
Diversibipalium lunatum 
Diversibipalium maculatum 
Diversibipalium madagascarense 
Diversibipalium marenzelleri 
Diversibipalium mayottensis 
Diversibipalium megacephalum 
Diversibipalium molle 
Diversibipalium multilineatum 
Diversibipalium murinum 
Diversibipalium natunense 
Diversibipalium negritorum 
Diversibipalium nigrilumbe 
Diversibipalium olivaceps 
Diversibipalium pictum 
Diversibipalium quadricinctum 
Diversibipalium rauchi 
Diversibipalium richtersi 
Diversibipalium ridleyi 
Diversibipalium roonwali 
Diversibipalium rotungense 
Diversibipalium salvini 
Diversibipalium sarasini 
Diversibipalium sexcinctum 
Diversibipalium shipleyi 
Diversibipalium solmsi 
Diversibipalium sordidum 
Diversibipalium splendens 
Diversibipalium steindachneri 
Diversibipalium stimpsoni 
Diversibipalium sumatrense 
Diversibipalium superbum 
Diversibipalium sylvestre 
Diversibipalium tamatavense 
Diversibipalium tau 
Diversibipalium tennenti 
Diversibipalium transversefasciatum 
Diversibipalium tripartitum 
Diversibipalium unicolor 
Diversibipalium vinosum 
Diversibipalium virchowi 
Diversibipalium virgatum 
Diversibipalium vittatum 
Diversibipalium weberi 
Diversibipalium whitehousei 
Diversibipalium wrighti

References 

Geoplanidae
Rhabditophora genera